A Light Woman is a 1928 British silent romance film directed by Adrian Brunel and starring Benita Hume, C. M. Hallard and Gerald Ames. It is also known by the alternative title Dolores. The screenplay concerns a flighty young woman who learns the error of her ways through a series of love affairs.

Cast
 Benita Hume as Dolores de Vargas 
 C. M. Hallard as Marquis de Vargas 
 Gerald Ames as Don Andrea
 Betty Carter as Pauline
 Donald Macardle as Ramiro 
 Lillian Christine as Isabel 
 Kitty Austin as La Frasquita 
 Dennis Ray as Enrique 
 Sidney Baron as Jose 
 Beaufoy Milton as Arturo

References

Bibliography
 Low, Rachael. History of the British Film, 1918-1929. George Allen & Unwin, 1971.

External links
 

1928 films
1920s romance films
British romance films
British silent feature films
Films directed by Adrian Brunel
Gainsborough Pictures films
British black-and-white films
1920s English-language films
1920s British films